Give Yourself Away is the second major studio album from contemporary Christian group Robbie Seay Band. It was released on August 28, 2007 through Sparrow Records.

Track listing

Singles
Song of Hope (Heaven Come Down)

References

2007 albums
Robbie Seay Band albums